Złotowo  is a settlement in the administrative district of Gmina Tuczno, within Wałcz County, West Pomeranian Voivodeship, in north-western Poland.

The settlement has a population of 30.

Until 1945/90 the area was part of Germany.

References

Villages in Wałcz County